Wanxian Bridge, or Wanzhou Bridge, is a reinforced concrete arch bridge built over the Yangtze River in 1997. It is located in the vicinity of the Three Gorges Dam in Wanzhou, Chongqing, China. The clearance height to the river below is  however the full clearance is no longer visible as the reservoir created by the construction of the Three Gorges Dam has increased the height of the water. During the bridge construction, a concrete-filled tubular arch truss frame was built to support the weight of the concrete arch and  embedded into the concrete arch.

The Wanxian Bridge is the longest existing concrete arch bridge in the world, displacing the previous record holder, the Croatian Krk Bridge. It is a major highway bridge with lanes for vehicles and pedestrians.

See also how to build it wanxian bridge
List of the largest arch bridges
Yangtze River bridges and tunnels

References

External links
Photo of bridge
Bridge Engineering:A global perspective, p. 341-342

Bridges in Chongqing
Bridges over the Yangtze River
Arch bridges in China
Bridges completed in 1997
Concrete bridges